The Image Channel is a private television channel in Nepal. It is owned by Image Group of Companies, which also run FM station and located in Lazimpat, Kathmandu. It produces several kinds of news programs, talkshows, entertainment shows, teleserials, etc. Image Channel went on air with a -hour block through Nepal Television on 25 January 1997. Its initial programs were focused on pop music, women, celebrity and fashion. Programs such as Image Pop, Button & Trades, AM Guest and Srijana ko Sansar gained huge popularity among the audiences.

Image then established itself as an inclusive Kathmandu Channel called the Image Metro on 11 February 2003. On 5 February 2007 Image expanded its broadcasts with worldwide satellite transmissions, becoming the first Nepali language satellite channel. Image has also launched an online news portal called Image Khabar on May 5, 2013.

List of programs broadcast by Image Channel

News
Image News
Image Sambad
Image Bisesh
TODAY NEWS

Music
Image Pop
Sms and More
MOYC (Music Of Your Choice)
Ukali Orali

Yearly event
Image Music Awards

Reality
Mega Model
Image Lok Kalakar
Image Rodhi Ghar

Events 
 Image Award, Nepals Biggest Music Award
April 2016, Police arrested a man on charge of hacking a Facebook page of Image Channel from Nepalgunj of Banke.

See also
List of Nepali television stations

References

External links
 
 Image Khabar
 Image News FM
 About Image Channel Live 
Image FM 97.9

Television channels in Nepal
2003 establishments in Nepal